Longarm is a 1988 western television film loosely based on the Jove Books series of the same name written under the house pseudonym, "Tabor Evans".

The film, set in the Territory of New Mexico in the 1870s, stars John Terlesky as the titular Deputy United States Marshal Custis Long, and features René Auberjonois as real-life territorial governor (and author of Ben-Hur: A Tale of the Christ) Lew Wallace. The film was intended as a pilot for a TV series based on the books, but the program was not picked up.

The "occasionally humorous script" was written by David J. Chisholm, a "veteran Western writer".

References

External links
 

1988 television films
1988 Western (genre) films
Films scored by Richard Stone (composer)
United States Marshals Service in fiction
American Western (genre) television films
Films directed by Virgil W. Vogel
1980s English-language films